The 1998–99 season are the Esteghlal Football Club's 7th season in the Azadegan League, and their 5th consecutive season in the top division of Iranian football. They are also competing in the Hazfi Cup and Asian Club Championship, and 54th year in existence as a football club.

Player
As of 1 September 2018.

Pre-season and friendlies

Competitions

Overview

Azadegan League

Standings

Results summary

Results by round

Matches

Hazfi Cup

1/8 finals

Quarterfinals

Semifinal

Final

Asian Club Championship

Second round

Quarterfinals

West Asia

Semifinals

Final

See also
 1998–99 Azadegan League
 1998–99 Hazfi Cup
 1998–99 Asian Club Championship

References

External links
 RSSSF

1998–99
Esteghlal